Mâcon-Loché TGV station (French: Gare de Mâcon-Loché TGV) is a railway station on the TGV Sud-Est located in the commune of Mâcon, Saône-et-Loire, France. Its address is 142, Rue de Pouilly-Loché, 71000 Mâcon, the station is a few kilometres from the neighbouring town of Loché. The next station southbound is Lyon Part-Dieu and the next northbound station is Le Creusot TGV.

The station
Mâcon-Loché TGV station is a basic station with four tracks. The two inner tracks are reserved for trains passing through; the two outer ones are served by side platforms. The station is connected to the regional rail network via shuttle bus.

In 2019, SNCF customers named Mâcon-Loché station as one of the best in the country for customer satisfaction, coming in behind Meuse and Belfort – Montbéliard.

History
Mâcon-Loché TGV opened on 27 September 1981, along with the first TGV line, the LGV Sud-Est. On 14 September 1992, the first high-speed accident in TGV history occurred at the station when Train 56 derailed while running at 270 km/h (167 mph). Nobody was killed, but some people waiting for another TGV on the platform were injured by ballast kicked up from the trackbed by the train.

See also 

 List of SNCF stations in Auvergne-Rhône-Alpes

References

External links
 

Railway stations in France opened in 1981
Macon-Loche